"Life Is Good" is a song by American rapper Future featuring Canadian rapper Drake. It was released on January 10, 2020 and later confirmed to be the third single from the former's eighth studio album High Off Life.

It debuted and peaked at number two on the US Billboard Hot 100 and became the first song ever to spend its first eight weeks at that position, behind Roddy Ricch's "The Box". It was Future's highest-charting song as a lead artist and his highest-charting song overall, until  the releases of "Way 2 Sexy" (with Young Thug) and "Wait 4 U" (with Tems), two more collaborations between Future and Drake that both debuted at the top of the charts. The track sold 9 million units in the US by March 3, 2021. The song was certified diamond by the RIAA on November 22, 2021 for selling over 10 million units in the United States.

Background and music video 
In late December 2019, Future and Drake were spotted in Atlanta, Georgia, filming a music video in a McDonald's location, leading to the belief that the two had a forthcoming collaboration. The shoot included recording artists such as 21 Savage, Mike Will Made-It, Lil Yachty and Big Bank. Word of the video spread when media personality DJ Akademiks posted the casting call for the video. Future had previously posted a snippet of what the duo were working on in his Instagram story.

The song and music video, directed by Julien Christian Lutz (Director X) were released at midnight on January 10. The music video depicts Future and Drake as men with ordinary jobs, including fast food workers, mechanics, IT workers, off-brand Apple Store employees, garbage men, chefs, aspiring rappers, and assistant directors.

The video on YouTube has reached over 2 billion views as of March 2023.

Remix 
On February 15, 2020, a remix of the song was released by Future featuring Drake and American rappers DaBaby and Lil Baby. Three days prior to the release, Future teased DaBaby and Lil Baby's vocals on an Instagram story. The remix is featured on Future's eighth studio album High Off Life, along with the original version.

A remix of the song was released by Lil Wayne off his mixtape No Ceilings 3.

Reception 
Jason Lipshutz of Billboard wrote that structuring the song in two halves—Drake performing the first half and Future performing the latter, each with a different beat—was reminiscent of Drake's previous feature on Travis Scott's 2018 hit "Sicko Mode". The review praised how the artists' styles complemented each other as they did on their joint mixtape in 2015. XXL described the production and instrumentation as "dreamy chords with a mid-tempo vibe".

Personnel 
Credits adapted from Tidal.

 Future – principal vocalist, songwriting
 Drake – featured vocalist, songwriting
 D. Hill – production, songwriting
 OZ – production, songwriting
 Ambezza – co-production, songwriting
 Colin Leonard – mastering engineer
 DaBaby – featured vocalist, songwriting 
 Lil Baby – featured vocalist, songwriting 
 Maudell Watkins – songwriting

Charts

Weekly charts

Remix

Year-end charts

Certifications and sales

Release history

References 

2020 singles
2020 songs
Future (rapper) songs
Drake (musician) songs
Trap music songs
Songs written by Future (rapper)
Songs written by Drake (musician)
Songs written by Oz (record producer)
Music videos directed by Director X
Epic Records singles